= Francis Ford Coppola bibliography =

A list of books and essays about Francis Ford Coppola:

- Coppola, Francis Ford (1 June 2003). Francis Ford Coppola's Zoetrope all-story 2. Harcourt. ISBN 978-0-15-601368-0.
- Coppola, Francis Ford; Phillips, Gene D.; Hill, Rodney (2004). Francis Ford Coppola: Interviews. Univ. Press of Mississippi. ISBN 978-1-57806-666-7.
- Phillips, Gene D. (5 December 2013). Godfather: The Intimate Francis Ford Coppola. University Press of Kentucky. ISBN 978-0-8131-4672-0.
- Schumacher, Michael (2000). Francis Ford Coppola: A Filmmaker's Life. Bloomsbury. ISBN 978-0-7475-5136-2.
- Welsh, James M.; Phillips, Gene D.; Hill, Rodney F. (27 August 2010). The Francis Ford Coppola Encyclopedia. Scarecrow Press. ISBN 978-0-8108-7651-4.

== The Godfather ==
- Browne, Nick (2000). Francis Ford Coppola's The Godfather Trilogy. Cambridge University Press. ISBN 978-0-521-55950-8.
- Lebo, Harlan (25 October 2005). The Godfather Legacy: The Untold Story of the Making of the Classic Godfather Trilogy Featuring Never-Before-Published Production Stills. Simon and Schuster. ISBN 978-0-7432-8777-7.
- Messenger, Chris (25 April 2002). The Godfather and American Culture: How the Corleones Became "Our Gang". SUNY Press. ISBN 978-0-7914-5357-5.
- Sciannameo, Franco (11 October 2010). Nino Rota's The Godfather Trilogy: A Film Score Guide. Scarecrow Press. ISBN 978-1-4616-6424-6.
